The Weekend Bride (German: Die Wochenendbraut) is a 1928 German silent comedy film directed by Georg Jacoby and starring Elga Brink and Ossi Oswalda.

The film's art direction was by Franz Schroedter.

Cast
In alphabetical order
Elga Brink as Uschi Poehlmann 
Werner Fuetterer as Dr. Schwarzecker  
Carola Höhn 
Paul Hörbiger as secretary 
Ossi Oswalda 
Kurt Vespermann as Fritz Bornemann

References

External links

Films of the Weimar Republic
German silent feature films
Films directed by Georg Jacoby
1928 comedy films
German comedy films
German black-and-white films
Silent comedy films
1920s German films
1920s German-language films